Nicholas P Cooper (born 1942) is a retired rower who competed for Great Britain.

Rowing career
Cooper represented Great Britain at five World Championships during the 1960s and, in 1967, won the British Sculling championships - The Wingfield Sculls. He won three events at Henley Royal Regatta.

References

1942 births
Living people
British male rowers